Lambros Kefalas (born 10 August 1953) is a Greek Olympic sprinter. He competed in the 100 meter sprint at the 1980 Summer Olympics in Moscow, USSR.

References

1953 births
Living people
Greek male sprinters
Olympic athletes of Greece
Athletes (track and field) at the 1980 Summer Olympics
20th-century Greek people